The Bombay, Baroda and Central India Railway (reporting mark BB&CI) was a company incorporated in 1855 to undertake the task of constructing railway lines between Bombay to the erstwhile Baroda State, that became the present-day Baroda (Vadodara) city in western India. BB&CI completed the work in 1864. The first suburban railway in India was started by BB&CI, operating between Virar and Churchgate (later extended to Colaba), a railway station in Bombay Backbay in April 1867.

The railway was divided into two main systems, broad (5 ft. 6 in.) and metre gauge. There was also a comparatively small mileage of 2 ft. 6 in. gauge line worked by the BB&CI on behalf of the Indian States. In 1947 the mileage of the respective portions was stated to be: broad gauge, 1,198 miles, with a further 69 miles worked for Indian States; metre gauge, 1,879 miles, with a further 106 miles worked for Indian States; narrow-gauge, 152 miles, worked for Indian States and various companies. Quadruple track mileage was 22 and double-track 250, the remainder of the system being single-track, whilst running powers were exercised over 147 miles (including the important section from Muttra Junction to Delhi, owned by the Great Indian Peninsular Railway).

The main headquarters of the BB&CI Railway was located at Churchgate, Bombay and the headquarters and workshops for the metre gauge tracks and services was located in Ajmer.

Description of systems 
The broad-gauge main line ran northwards from Bombay to Baroda, where it bifurcated, the north-east main line continuing towards Delhi, and the north-west main line to the industrial city of Ahmedabad and onwards to Viramgam and Kharagoda. The north-east main line passed through Godhra, Ratlam, Kotah and Bayana (from where a branch line ran to Agra Fort), to Muttra Junction, where it joined the Great Indian Peninsular Railway, over which it had running powers for 90 miles into Delhi.

The metre-gauge system was originally the Rajputana Malwa State Railway. It began at Ahmedabad and ran northwards through Baroda State and Rajputana via Abu, Ajmer, Jaipur and Rewari to Delhi. There were branches from Rewari to Bhatinda and Fazilka, from Ajmer to Ratlam, Indore and Khandwa, and from Achnera to Cawnpore.

Organisation 
The original Bombay, Baroda & Central India Railway Company was purchased by the Government of India in 1905, but continued to be worked by a company with a board of directors in London until 1 January 1942, on which date the working was taken over by the government and it became part of the Indian State Railway system, directly under the Railway Board.

Construction and opening 
The section from Churchgate to Ahmedabad was opened in stages between 1860 and 1870. The original Bombay terminus was at Grant Road, subsequently extended to Churchgate in 1870 and to Colaba, at the southern tip of the island of Bombay, in 1873. After the new Bombay Central station was opened in 1930, the line between Churchgate and Colaba was closed and removed.

The section from Godhra to Nagda was opened in 1896 and extended to Baroda. Nagda to Muttra Junction was opened in 1909, making possible through broad-gauge running between Bombay and Delhi.

The metre-gauge system was originally the Rajputana Malwa State Railway and was taken over subsequently by the BB&CI. The metre-gauge main line from Delhi to Jaipur was completed in 1874, extended to Ajmer in 1875 and to Ahmedabad in 1881. The branch from Rewari to Bhatinda and Fazilka was begun in 1881 by the Ferozepore & Rewari Railway, but the section between Bhatinda and Ferozepore was subsequently built to the broad-gauge and passed to the GIPR.

Electrification 
The Colaba-Borivali section (37.8 km) was electrified on 5 January 1928 on the 1.5 kV DC system. The two tracks between Colaba and Grant Road stations were electrified, while four tracks between Grant Road and Bandra railway stations were electrified. Only two suburban tracks between Bandra and Borivali were electrified in 1928, two main tracks were left for the steam locomotives. In 1933, Colaba railway station and two electrified tracks between Colaba and Churchgate railway stations were dismantled. In 1936, electrification was extended to the two main tracks between Bandra and Borivali railway stations, left earlier and the two main tracks between Borivali and Virar railway stations were also electrified, resulting in completion of the electrification of the Churchgate-Virar section.

Locomotives and rolling stock 

By the end of 1877 the company owned 77 steam locomotives, 295 coaches and 2,644 goods wagons. At the end of 1910 there where 7272 goods wagon. In 1936 the BB&CI owned 833 locomotives, 43 railcars, 1963 coaches and over 20.000 goods wagons.

In 1947, the total numbers of broad-gauge locomotives in service were 363 steam, 10 diesel and 2 electric. There were 1,042 passenger coaches (including 40 electric motor and 120 electric trailer coaches) and 10,584 goods wagons.

The equivalent figures for the metre-gauge were 437 locomotives, 1,335 coaches, 3 Sentinel steam coaches, and 9,127 wagons.

On the 2 ft. 6 in. gauge there were 20 locomotives, 58 coaches and 259 wagons.

Classification
It was labeled as a Class I railway according to Indian Railway Classification System of 1926.

Later developments 
In 1949, after independence of India, Gaekwar's Baroda State Railway was merged in to Bombay, Baroda and Central India Railway by Government of India.

On 5 November 1951 the Bombay, Baroda and Central India Railway was merged with the Saurashtra Railway, Rajputana Railway, Jaipur State Railway and Cutch State Railway to give rise to the Western Railway.

Gandhi film 
The railway is featured in many travel scenes in the 1982 film Gandhi which tells the story of the leader of India's independence movement, Gandhi played by the actor Ben Kingsley.

See also 
 Frederick William Stevens, architect and engineer
 Charles Ollivant, company director

References

Notes

Further reading

External links 
 

Transport in Mumbai
Transport in Vadodara
Defunct railway companies of India
History of rail transport in Gujarat
Rail transport in Maharashtra
Railway companies established in 1855
Railway companies disestablished in 1951
1855 establishments in India
1855 establishments in British India
1951 disestablishments in India
Indian companies established in 1855